The knockout stage of the 2008–09 UEFA Cup began on 18 February 2009, and concluded with the final at the Şükrü Saracoğlu Stadium in Istanbul on 20 May 2009. The final phase involved the 24 teams that finished in the top three in each group in the group stage and the eight teams that finished in third place in the UEFA Champions League group stage.

Each tie in the final phase, apart from the final, was played over two legs, with each team playing one leg at home. The team that had the higher aggregate score over the two legs progressed to the next round. In the event that aggregate scores finished level, the team that scored more goals away from home over the two legs progressed. If away goals are also equal, 30 minutes of extra time were played. If goals were scored during extra time and the aggregate score was still level, the visiting team qualified by virtue of more away goals scored. If no goals were scored during extra time, there would be a penalty shootout after extra time.

In the draw for the Round of 32, matches were played between the winner of one group and the third-placed team of a different group, and between the runners-up of one group and the third-placed team from a Champions League group. The only restriction on the drawing of teams in the Round of 32 was that the teams must not be from the same national association or have played in the same group in the group stages. From the Round of 16 onwards, these restrictions did not apply.

In the final, the tie was played over just one leg at a neutral venue. If scores were level at the end of normal time in the final, extra time was played, followed by penalties if scores had remained tied.

Bracket

Round of 32
The draw for the Round of 32 took place on 19 December 2008, the day after the final round of UEFA Cup group stage matches. The draw was conducted by UEFA Secretary David Taylor and 2009 UEFA Cup Final ambassador Can Bartu, and featured the top three teams from each group in the group stage and the eight third-place finishers from the UEFA Champions League group stage. The draw saw each UEFA Cup group winner paired with the third-placed team from another UEFA Cup group and each UEFA Cup group runner-up paired with a third-placed team from the UEFA Champions League, with the only restriction on the draw being that teams from the same national association could not be drawn together. The UEFA Cup group winners and runners-up each played the second leg of their Round of 32 ties at home.

|}

First leg

Second leg

CSKA Moscow won 3–1 on aggregate.

Metalist Kharkiv won 3–0 on aggregate.

Hamburg won 4–0 on aggregate.

Marseille 1–1 Twente on aggregate. Marseille won 7–6 on penalties.

Paris Saint-Germain won 5–1 on aggregate.

Galatasaray won 4–3 on aggregate.

Zenit St. Petersburg won 4–2 on aggregate.

Werder Bremen 3–3 Milan on aggregate. Werder Bremen won on away goals.

Braga won 4–1 on aggregate.

Udinese won 4–3 on aggregate.

Manchester City won 4–3 on aggregate.

Ajax won 2–1 on aggregate.

Saint-Étienne won 5–2 on aggregate.

Aalborg BK won 6–1 on aggregate.

Shakhtar Donetsk won 3–1 on aggregate.

Dynamo Kyiv 3–3 Valencia on aggregate. Dynamo Kyiv won on away goals.

Round of 16
The draw for the Round of 16 took place on 19 December 2008, immediately after the draw for the Round of 32. Each tie in the Round of 32 were numbered and teams were drawn for the Round of 16 as "Winners of match 1", "Winners of match 2", etc. The teams drawn first in each Round of 16 tie will play the first leg at home.

|}

First leg

Second leg

Werder Bremen won 3–2 on aggregate.

Marseille won 4–3 on aggregate.

Metalist Kharkiv 3–3 Dynamo Kyiv. Dynamo Kyiv won on away goals.

Shakhtar Donetsk won 2–1 on aggregate.

Udinese won 2–1 on aggregate.

Hamburg won 4–3 on aggregate.

Manchester City 2–2 Aalborg BK on aggregate. Manchester City won 4–3 on penalties.

Paris Saint-Germain won 1–0 on aggregate.

Quarter-finals
The draw for the quarter-finals took place at UEFA headquarters in Nyon, Switzerland, on 20 March 2009.

|}

First leg

Second leg

Hamburg won 4–3 on aggregate.

Dynamo Kyiv won 3–0 on aggregate.

Shaktar Donetsk won 4–1 on aggregate.

Werder Bremen won 6–4 on aggregate.

Semi-finals

The draw for the semi-finals took place immediately after the draw for the quarter-finals. The first legs will be played on 30 April and the second legs on 7 May.

|}

First leg

Second leg

Shakhtar Donetsk won 3–2 on aggregate.

Werder Bremen 3–3 Hamburg on aggregate. Werder Bremen won on away goals.

Final

References

Final phase
UEFA Cup knockout phases